Isotria (fiveleaf orchid) is a genus of flowering plants from the orchid family, Orchidaceae.

Species
The genus has two known species, both native to eastern North America.

References

External links

Vanilloideae genera
Pogonieae
Orchids of North America
Orchids of Canada
Orchids of the United States